Stephen Watson Fullom (1818 – 1872) was a journalist, author of several books, and a publisher's reader.

Career
Several of Fullom's books were reviewed in the Athenaeum. His book The marvels of science, and their testimony to Holy Writ, first published by Longman in 1852, was a best-seller of its day and by 1856 had run through 10 editions. He was a publisher's reader for the firm of Henry Colburn and recommended Margaret Oliphant's first novel (Margaret Maitland) for publication.

Family
On 31 August 1847 he married Caroline Elizabeth Wickham.

Books

References

1818 births
1872 deaths
English male journalists
19th-century British journalists
19th-century English non-fiction writers
19th-century English male writers